Roseburg shooting may refer to:

Umpqua Community College shooting, a 2015 mass shooting in Roseburg, Oregon
A 2006 shooting incident at Roseburg High School